The United Counties of Northumberland and Durham was a historic county in the Canadian province of Ontario.  The two counties were originally combined in the District of Newcastle formed in 1802, and continued as united counties from 1850 until January 1, 1974 when portions of Durham County were amalgamated with adjacent Ontario County to form the Regional Municipality of Durham. Manvers Township went to Victoria County and what is now Cavan-Monaghan went to Peterborough County. What is now Port Hope remained in the area which was continued as Northumberland County, while Durham County was dissolved.

Former counties in Ontario
Populated places disestablished in 1974